Neoromicia is a genus of vesper bat in the family Vespertilionidae. It contains the following species: 
 Anchieta's serotine (Neoromicia anchietae)
 Kirindy serotine (Neoromicia bemainty)
 Yellow serotine (Neoromicia flavescens)
 Tiny serotine (Neoromicia guineensis)
 Melck's house bat (Neoromicia melckorum)
 Somali serotine (Neoromicia somalica)
 Zulu serotine (Neoromicia zuluensis)

This genus formerly contained many more species, but most of these were reclassified into Afronycteris, Laephotis, or Pseudoromicia.

References

 
Bat genera
Taxonomy articles created by Polbot